The Draughts World Championship is the world championship in international draughts, since 1973 organised among women by the World Draughts Federation (FMJD). Since 1981 the championship occurs every two years. In the even year following the tournament must take place the World Title match.

The first began in 1973 in the Netherlands and has had winners from the Soviet Union, Latvia, Ukraine, and Russia. The current women's champion is Matrena Nogovitsyna, she previously didn't win the championship.

See also 
List of Draughts World Championship winners
World Checkers/Draughts Championship

References

FMJD list women world champions

External links
World Draughts Federation
World Champions

Draughts world championships
Draughts competitions